Strabane Lower (named after Strabane) is a barony in County Tyrone, Northern Ireland. It is bordered by five other baronies in Northern Ireland: North West Liberties of Derry to the north; Tirkeeran to the north-east; Strabane Upper to the east; Omagh East to the south; and Omagh West to the south-west. It also borders two baronies in County Donegal in the Republic of Ireland: Raphoe North and Raphoe South to the west.

List of settlements
Below is a list of settlements in Strabane Lower:

Towns
Strabane

Villages
Ardstraw
Artigarvan
Ballymagorry
Clady
Donemana
Newtownstewart
Sion Mills

List of civil parishes
Below is a list of civil parishes in Strabane Lower:

 Ardstraw (split with barony of Omagh West)
 Camus
 Cumber Upper (mainly in barony of Tirkeeran, one townland in Strabane Lower)
 Donaghedy
 Learmount
 Leckpatrick
 Urney (split with barony of Omagh West)

References